Gerard Theodore van Belle (born 1968, in Tallahassee, FL) is an American astronomer. He is an expert in optical (visible and near-infrared) astronomical interferometry.

Education
van Belle received a bachelor's degree in physics from Whitman College in 1990, a master's degree in physics from The Johns Hopkins University in 1993, and a Ph.D. in physics from the University of Wyoming in 1996. While at Whitman College, he initiated as a member of the Sigma Chi fraternity.

Career
After schooling, van Belle took a position at the Jet Propulsion Laboratory as an instrument architect for NASA's Keck Interferometer, and later joined the Michelson Science Center (now NASA Exoplanet Science Institute) at Caltech in 2003. He has participated in the commissioning of the Palomar Testbed Interferometer, and the CHARA Array. In 2007, he became a member of the astronomy faculty at the European Southern Observatory (ESO), and instrument scientist for the PRIMA instrument of ESO's VLTI facility; later in early 2011 he was also appointed instrument scientist for the MATISSE instrument of the VLTI. Since August 2011 he has been a member of the astronomer faculty at Lowell Observatory.  In May 2017 he was appointed the Director of the Navy Precision Optical Interferometer (NPOI), and after a one-year tenure became Chief Scientist for the facility. NPOI is a joint program between partners Lowell Observatory, the Naval Research Laboratory, and the US Naval Observatory.

Research
van Belle utilized near-infrared astronomical interferometers to measure the sizes of hundreds of nearby stars.

 
The first direct measurement of stellar shape was carried out by a team led by him using the Palomar Testbed Interferometer to make observations of the rapidly rotating star Altair. He also contributed to practical considerations of operating astronomical interferometers, particularly regarding considerations of calibration of these complicated instruments

.

Leadership
van Belle served as President of the International Astronomical Union's Commission 54 on Optical and Infrared Interferometry, for 2012-2015, after terms as Vice President (2009-2012) and Secretary (2006-2009).

Honors, awards and accolades
Asteroid 25155 van Belle is named for him.

Personal life

References

External links
 Lowell Observatory's page for van Belle
 IAU Commission 54 wiki
 Twitter @FringeDoctor

American astronomers
Whitman College alumni
Johns Hopkins University alumni
University of Wyoming alumni
Living people
1968 births